Naomi Cleaver (born 14 July 1967 in Whitstable, Kent, England) is a British design consultant and interior designer.

She is also a television presenter of such programs as Other People's Houses and Channel 4's Honey I Ruined the House. In October 2014, she was the designer for DIY SOS.

References

External links
 Naomi Cleaver's official website

Naomi Cleaver at KBJ Management
YouTube interview with Naomi Cleaver

1967 births
Living people
British television personalities
People from Whitstable